The New Adventures of Curve is the fifth and final studio album released by the British band Curve.

The LP was exclusively available via the group's official website.

Track listing
"Answers" - 5:28
"Till The Cows Come Home" - 6:54
"Every Good Girl" - 7:38
"Cold Comfort (Deepsky Remix)" - 6:24
"Star" - 6:45
"Nice and Easy" - 3:26
"Signals and Alibis" - 7:12
"Sinner" - 5:08
"Joy" - 4:25

Curve (band) albums
2002 albums